The EF8–15mm 4L FISHEYE USM is a fisheye zoom lens for Canon digital single-lens reflex cameras (DSLRs) with an EF lens mount. It delivers 180° diagonal angle of view images for all EOS SLR cameras with imaging formats ranging from full-frame to APS-C, and provides 180° circular fisheye images for full-frame EOS models. Announced by Canon in 2010, it features UD glass for suppression of chromatic aberration and a subwavelength coating for reduced ghosting. It has full-time manual focus for instant switching from AF to Manual operation.

Firsts

This lens broke new market ground in several respects:
 It is the first Canon EF lens to offer 180° circular fisheye images for full frame image sensors. Note Canon had a circular fisheye lens for the FD mount.
 It is the first zoom fisheye lens for any DSLR to offer a full 180° angle of view in both circular and rectangular image formats.
 It is the first lens by any manufacturer to offer a 180° angle of view for APS-H (1.3x crop factor) bodies.
 Also, it is the first zoom fisheye lens to offer a 180° angle of view on both full-frame and cropped bodies.

References

External links

Specifications
 Canon EF 8–15mm f/4L Fisheye USM

08
Canon EF lenses
Fisheye lenses
Camera lenses introduced in 2010